The C635 DDCT is a six-speed, dual-dry-clutch automatic transmission developed jointly by Fiat Powertrain Technologies (FPT), Magneti Marelli and BorgWarner, and is manufactured by FPT at the Verrone, Italy plant. The transmission utilizes a control system produced by Magneti Marelli which integrates BorgWarner's hydraulic actuation module into its own power and transmission control units. It is marketed variously under the trade names TCT - Twin Clutch Transmission (Alfa Romeo), Euro Twin Clutch Transmission (Fiat USA), TCSS - The Twin Clutch System (Suzuki) and Dual-Dry-Clutch Auto Transmission (Dodge).

Applications
Alfa Romeo Tonale/Dodge Hornet
Alfa Romeo 4C
Alfa Romeo MiTo
Alfa Romeo Giulietta
Dodge Dart
Fiat 500L
Fiat 500X
Fiat Tipo (2015)
Fiat Viaggio
Jeep Renegade
Suzuki SX4
Suzuki Vitara

C725 7 speed
Three FCA models currently have this transmission as an option, the Fiat Ottimo, the Fiat Viaggio, and the Alfa Romeo Tonale. With the Fiat models produced and sold only in China.

Fiat Ottimo
Fiat Viaggio
Alfa Romeo Tonale

References

Dual-clutch transmissions
Fiat